Lafrance, LaFrance, la France and other variations may refer to:

Places
 France, a country in Europe (la France in French)
 Pont-Lafrance, New Brunswick, Canada, a former municipality which is now part of Grand Tracadie–Sheila
 La France, South Carolina, United States
 Maison Lafrance, New Brunswick, Canada, a residence at the University of Moncton
 LaFrance Hotel, Florida, United States

People
 Adélard Lafrance (1912–1995), a Canadian hockey player
 Émilien Lafrance (1911–1977), a Canadian politician
 George LaFrance (born 1965), an American arena football player
 Helen LaFrance (1919–2020), an American artist
 Joseph La France (1707–1745), a Metis fur trader
 Kienan LaFrance (born 1991), a Canadian Canadian football player
 Kevin Lafrance (born 1990), a French-Haitian soccer player
 Leo Lafrance (1902–1993), a Canadian hockey player
 Noémie Lafrance (born 1973), a Canadian choreographer
 Paul Lafrance (born 1974), a Canadian TV personality and builder
 Yvon Lafrance (born 1944), a Canadian politician
 LaMelo Lafrance Ball (born 2001), an American basketball player

Other uses
 La France (airship), launched in 1884
 GWR 102 La France, a locomotive
 Rosa 'La France', an hybrid tea rose developed in 1867
 La France (French newspaper)
 La France (film), a 2007 French film
 La France (song), a 2001 song by Sniper
 "La France", a single by the Dutch pop group BZN

See also
 American LaFrance
 Ward LaFrance Truck Corporation
 France (disambiguation)